Justin Alexander Adams (born 22 July 1961) is an English guitarist and composer who works in blues and African styles.

Biography
Born in London, the son of a diplomat, Adams spent some of his early childhood growing up in Egypt, before returning with his family to England.

He began his career in music in the 1980s with the band The Impossible Dreamers. He then joined Jah Wobble's Invaders of the Heart.

His first solo album was Desert Road in 2001, and he also wrote the score for Elaine Proctor's 2000 film Kin.

Adams co-wrote the 2005 Robert Plant album Mighty ReArranger, and is a producer. He has worked with Saharan desert blues group Tinariwen, whose first and third albums he produced, Robert Plant's Strange Sensation band, and has collaborated with Brian Eno, Sinéad O'Connor, Lo'Jo and musicians from African, Arabic and Irish traditions.

From 2007, he collaborated with Gambian griot Juldeh Camara (sometimes under the name 'JUJU'), resulting in the albums Soul Science, Tell No Lies (which won a Songlines 'Cross-Cultural Collaboration' award), The Trance Sessions, and In Trance. He also recorded with Ben Mandelson and Lu Edmonds as Les Triaboliques, releasing the album rivermudtwilight (2009). He produced the 2013 Zoom album of Rachid Taha.

In 2014, he performed with Robert Plant at Glastonbury Festival.

Personal life
Adams and his wife have two children.

Discography
Desert Road (2001), Wayward
Kin: The Original Motion Picture Soundtrack (2001), Wayward
Soul Science (2007), Wayward - Justin Adams & Juldeh Camara
Tell No Lies (2009), Real World - Justin Adams & Juldeh Camara
rivermudtwilight (2009), World Village - Les Triaboliques
The Trance Sessions (2010), Real World - Justin Adams & Juldeh Camara
In Trance (2011), Real World - JUJU
Ribbons (2017), Wayward/DJA Records - Justin Adams & Anneli Drecker
Still Moving (2021), Rough Trade - Justin Adams & Mauro Durante

References

External links
 
 Justin Adams statistics and tagging at Last.FM

Living people
1961 births
People from Westminster
English male guitarists
Musicians from London
Date of birth missing (living people)